Michael Lennon may refer to:

J. Michael Lennon, academic
Michael Lennon of Venice (band)
Mike Lennon (ice hockey) in 2009–10 SIJHL season
Mike Lennon (musician), see Rusko (musician)#Remixes